The 2022 Adriatica Ionica Race/Sulle Rotte della Serenissima was a road cycling stage race that took place between 4 and 8 June 2022 in the northeastern Italy. It was the fourth edition of the Adriatica Ionica Race and a category 2.1 event on the 2022 UCI Europe Tour. The race was won by Filippo Zana who didn't win a stage but finished second in two decisive stages.

Teams 
One UCI WorldTeam, six UCI ProTeams, nine UCI Continental teams, and one national team made up the seventeen teams that participated in the race.

The favorites for the overall race victory included; Lorenzo Fortunato, Sebastián Henao, Santiago Umba, Christian Scaroni (Italy), Nicholas Dlamini, Davide Rebellin, Henok Mulueberhan and Filippo Zana.

UCI WorldTeams

 

UCI ProTeams

 
 
 
 
 
 

UCI Continental Teams

 
 
 
 
 
 
 
 
 

National Teams

 Italy

Route 
The full race route details were revealed in a press conference on 10 June 2021.

Stages

Stage 1 
4 June 2022 – Tarvisio to Monfalcone,

Stage 2 
5 June 2022 – Castelfranco Veneto to Cima Grappa

Stage 3 
6 June 2022 – Ferrara to Brisighella

Stage 4 
7 June 2022 – Fano to Numana

Stage 5 
8 June 2022 – Castelraimondo to Ascoli Piceno

Classification leadership table

Notes
 On stage 2 third placed in the points competition, Raúl García Pierna, wore the red points jersey as first placed Christian Scaroni wore the blue jersey as overall leader and second placed Filippo Zana wore white as young rider leader.
 On stage 3 Edoardo Sandri wore the youth jersey as leader Filippo Zana already wore the blue jersey. Also Christian Scaroni wore the points jersey for the same reason.

Final classification standings

General classification

Points classification

Mountains classification

Young rider classification

Team classification

References

Notes

Sources

External links 
 

Adriatica Ionica Race
Adriatica Ionica Race
Adriatica Ionica Race